Fuuen Dam  is a rockfill dam located in Hokkaido Prefecture in Japan. The dam is used for irrigation. The catchment area of the dam is 23 km2. The dam impounds about 27  ha of land when full and can store 2918 thousand cubic meters of water. The construction of the dam was completed in 1986.

References

Dams in Hokkaido